Ruth Ryan Langan (born 12 December 1937 in Detroit) was an American writer of romance novels. She is a New York Times Bestselling author of over one hundred novels, both historical and contemporary under the penname Ruth Langan. She also writes contemporary Western romantic suspense for Grand Central Publishing, as well as some novellas for Jove under the pseudonym R. C. Ryan.

Biography 
Ruth Ryan Langan began her writing career in secret. Her family discovered her writings when her children came home unexpectedly from school one day and found her writing. When Langan's husband was told of her hobby, he bought her an electric typewriter "because 'writers need tools'". Her first book was published by Silhouette Books in 1981 after an editor picked it out of their slush pile. After the first sale was completed, Langan got an agent.

Langan is a charter member of the Romance Writers of America, and a member of DWW (Detroit Working Writers). She has five children and lives in Michigan.

Bibliography

As Ruth Langan

Texas 

Texas Heart (1989)
Texas Healer (1992)
Texas Hero (1993)

Highlander Series 

One Christmas Night (1999) also in omnibus One Christmas Night
Highland Barbarian (1990) also in omnibus Ransomed Brides
Highland Heather (1991)
Highland Fire (1991)
Highland Heart (1992)
The Highlander (1994)
Highland Heaven (1995)

The Jewels of Texas 

Diamond (1996)
Pearl (1996)
Jade (1997)
Ruby (1997)
Malachite (1998)

O'Neil Saga 

Rory (2002)
Conor (1999)
Briana (1999)

Wildes of Wyoming 

Chance (2000)
Hazard (2000)
Ace (2000)

Sirens of the Sea 

The Sea Witch (2000)
The Sea Nymph (2001)
The Sea Sprite (2001)

Lassiter Law 

By Honor Bound (2001)
Return of the Prodigal Son (2002)
Banning's Woman (2002)
His Father's Son (2002)

Sullivan Sisters 

Awakening Alex (2001)
Loving Lizbeth (2001)
Seducing Celeste (2001)

Badlands 

Badlands Law (2002)
Badlands Legend (2002)
Badlands Heart (2002)

Mystical Highlands 

Highland Sword (2003)
The Betrayal (2003)
The Knight and the Seer (2003)

Devil’s Cove 

Cover-Up (2004) also in Cover-Up / Shadows of the Past 
Wanted (2004)
Vendetta (2004)
Retribution (2004)

Stand Alone Novels 

Just Like Yesterday (1981)
Hidden Isle (1983)
Beloved Gambler (1984)
No Gentle Love (1984)
Eden of Temptation (1984)
Nevada Nights (1985)
This Time Forever (1985)
Star-crossed (1985)
Family Secrets (1985)
To Love a Dreamer (1985)
September's Dream (1985)
Mysteries of the Heart (1986)
Whims of Fate (1986)
The Proper Miss Porter (1987)
Destiny's Daughter (1987)
Mistress of the Seas (1988)
Passage West (1988)
The Heart's Secrets (1989)
Captive of Desire (1990)
Christmas Miracle (1992)
Addy Starr (1992)
Deception (1993)
All That Glitters (1994)
Christmas Miracle (1994)
Dulcie's Gift (1996)
The Courtship of Izzy McCree (1998)
Blackthorne (1998)
Paradise Falls (2004)
Ashes of Dreams (2005)
Duchess of Fifth Avenue (2006)
Heart's Delight (2007)
Angel (2014)
Cross His Heart (2015)
Passion's Law (2001) #7 in The Coltons Series
Snowbound Cinderella (1999) #6 in the Fortunes of Texas Series
Maverick Hearts (1996) also in omnibus Outlaw Brides

As R. C. Ryan

McCords 

Montana Legacy (2010)
Montana Destiny (2010)
Montana Glory (2010)

Wyoming Sky 

Quinn (2012)
Josh (2012)
Jake (2013)

Copper Creek Cowboys 

The Maverick of Copper Creek (2014)
The Rebel of Copper Creek (2015)
The Legacy of Copper Creek (2015)

Home for Christmas 

Home for Christmas (2015)
Christmas at Bitter Creek (2015) also in omnibus Historical Christmas Stories 1990 and Safe Haven for Christmas

Malloys of Montana 

Matt (2016)
Luke (2016)
A Cowboy's Christmas Eve (2016)
Reed (2017)

Montana Strong 

Cowboy on my Mind (2018)
Cowboy Next Door (2019)
A Cowboy To Love (2019)

Anthologies and collections

References

External links
 Official website

20th-century American novelists
21st-century American novelists
American romantic fiction writers
American women novelists
Living people
Novelists from Michigan
20th-century American women writers
21st-century American women writers
1937 births